Urmekeyevo (Ürmäkäy) is a rural locality (a selo) in Sayranovsky Selsoviet, Tuymazinsky District, Bashkortostan, Russia. The population was 315 as of 2010. There are 3 streets.

Geography 
Urmekeyevo is located 49 km southeast of Tuymazy (the district's administrative centre) by road. Tyupkildy is the nearest rural locality.

References 

Rural localities in Tuymazinsky District